Percy Luthere "Puss" Traub (August 23, 1896 – May 5, 1948) was a Canadian ice hockey player who played professionally between 1921 and 1929 for the Regina Capitals and Portland Rosebuds of the Western Canada Hockey League/Western Hockey League and with the Chicago Black Hawks and Detroit Cougars of the National Hockey League.

Playing career
Traub played for the Regina Victorias from 1915 to 1916, and 1917 to 1921, Regina 217th Battalion from 1916 to 1917, Regina Depot from 1917 to 1918, Regina Capitals from 1921 to 1925, Portland Rosebuds from 1925 to 1926, Chicago Black Hawks from 1926 to 1927, and the Detroit Cougars from 1928 to 1930. Traub was a member of the WCHL Second All-Star Team in 1922 and 1923, and the WCHL First All-Star Team in 1924.

Post-playing career
After his hockey career Traub turned to refereeing and then went into the insurance business.

Traub died at the age of 51 from a heart attack and was buried in Mount Pleasant Burial Park in Swift Current, Saskatchewan.

Career statistics

Regular season and playoffs

External links

1896 births
1948 deaths
Canadian ice hockey defencemen
Chicago Blackhawks players
Detroit Cougars players
Ice hockey people from Ontario
People from Bruce County
Portland Rosebuds players
Regina Capitals players